Tīnui, also spelled Tinui and formerly spelled Tenui, is a small village approximately 40 kilometres from Masterton, in the Wairarapa, New Zealand.

History

Tīnui was the first place in New Zealand to have an ANZAC Day cross: On 25 April 1916, the local vicar led an expedition to place a large metal cross to commemorate the dead on Tīnui Taipo, a 360 m (1200 ft) high promontory behind the village, and a service was held. In 2006, the 90th anniversary was commemorated with a 21-gun salute fired by soldiers from Waiouru Army Camp. In 2009, the Air Force began promoting Tīnui as an alternative to travelling to Gallipoli. Veterans' Affairs Minister Judith Collins said of the promotion: "I would be delighted to see Tīnui become a place where people come to pay their respects and remember those who have fallen."

Tīnui has been flooded often, as it is situated on the river flats next to the confluence of the Whareama River and the Tīnui Stream. The first recorded flood was in 1858, when water covered the river flats. In 1936, floods caused thousands of sheep to drown and floodwaters reached a depth of 450 mm inside the Tīnui Hotel. The 1991 floods devastated the village when 200 mm of rain fell over a 24-hour period, and the river flooded again in July 1992.

Demographics
Tīnui is part of the Whareama statistical area.

Education

Tīnui School is a co-educational state primary school for Year 1 to 8 students from the Mangapakeha, Tīnui, Annedale, Tīnui Valley, Whakataki, Castlepoint, and Mataikona areas.

References 

Populated places in the Wellington Region
Masterton District
Wairarapa